The Sharif of Mecca or Hejaz was the title of the leader of the Sharifate of Mecca, traditional steward of the holy cities of Mecca and Medina and the surrounding Hejaz. The term sharif is Arabic for "noble", "highborn", and is used to describe the descendants of the Prophet Muhammad's grandson al-Hassan ibn Ali.

The Sharif was charged with protecting the cities and their environs and ensuring the safety of pilgrims performing the Hajj. The title is sometimes spelled Sheriff or  Sherif, with the latter variant used, for example, by T. E. Lawrence in Seven Pillars of Wisdom.

The office of the Sharif of Mecca dates back to the late Abbasid era. Until 1200, the Sharifate was held by a member of the Hawashim clan, not to be confused with the larger clan of Banu Hashim from which all Sharifs claim descent. Descendants of the Banu Hashim continued to hold the position until the 20th century on behalf of various Muslim powers including the Ayyubids and the Mamluks. In 1517, the Sharif acknowledged the supremacy of the Ottoman Caliph, but maintained a great degree of local autonomy. 
During the Ottoman era, the Sharifate expanded its authority northwards to include Medina, and southwards to the frontiers of 'Asir, and regularly raided Nejd.

The Sharifate came to an end shortly after the reign of Hussein bin Ali, who ruled from 1908, who rebelled against the Ottoman rule during the Arab Revolt of 1916. After the defeat of the Ottoman Empire in 1918 and its subsequent dissolution in 1923, Hussein declared himself Caliph. The British granted control over the newly formed states of Iraq and Transjordan to his sons Faisal and Abdullah. In 1924, however, in the face of increasing attacks by Ibn Saud, Hussein abdicated his political titles to his eldest son, Ali bin Hussein, who was to become the last Grand Sharif. At the end of 1925, Ibn Saud conquered the Hejaz and expelled the Hashemites. The House of Saud has ruled the holy cities and overseen the Hajj since that time.

List of Sharifs of Mecca (967–1925)

During the Fatimid Dynasty (967–1101)

During the Ayyubid Empire (1201–1254)

1250–1301

During the Mamluk Empire (1254–1517)

During the Ottoman Empire (1517–1917)

During the Kingdom of Hejaz (1916–1925)

See also
Custodian of the Two Holy Mosques
Hashemite custodianship of Jerusalem holy sites
Sharifate of Mecca
Hejaz Vilayet
Kingdom of Hejaz
Sharifian Caliphate
Battle of Mecca (1916)
Battle of Mecca (1924)
Siege of Medina
List of Caliphs
List of Sunni Muslim dynasties

References

Bibliography

 
 
 
 
 

 
967 establishments
Mecca